Bill Hickey is an American football coach.

Coaching career
Hickey was the head football coach for the Coast Guard Bears located in New London, Connecticut.  He held that position for 4 seasons, from 1976 until 1979. His coaching record at Coast Guard was 11 wins, 26 losses and 1 tie.

References

Living people
Coast Guard Bears football coaches
Year of birth missing (living people)